The 1908 United States House of Representatives elections in Florida for three House seats in the 61st Congress were held November 3, 1908 alongside the election for President and the election for governor.

Background
The Democratic Party continued their domination of Florida's politics, having won re-election in all three districts by large majorities in the previous election year against the Republicans and the Socialists.

Election results
William B. Lamar (D) of the  declined to run for re-election, instead campaigning unsuccessfully for election to the Senate.

See also
United States House of Representatives elections, 1908

References

1908
Florida
United States House of Representatives